Narsingdi-4 is a constituency represented in the Jatiya Sangsad (National Parliament) of Bangladesh since 2008 by Nurul Majid Mahmud Humayun of the Awami League.

Boundaries 
The constituency encompasses Belabo and Manohardi upazilas.

History 
The constituency was created in 1984 from the Dhaka-24 constituency when the former Dhaka District was split into six districts: Manikganj, Munshiganj, Dhaka, Gazipur, Narsingdi, and Narayanganj.

Members of Parliament

Elections

Elections in the 2010s 
Nurul Majid Mahmud Humayun was re-elected unopposed in the 2014 general election after opposition parties withdrew their candidacies in a boycott of the election.

Elections in the 2000s

Elections in the 1990s

References

External links
 

Parliamentary constituencies in Bangladesh
Narsingdi District